Napoleon is a 1951 Italian comedy film directed by Carlo Borghesio and starring Renato Rascel in the title role.

Plot

Cast

References

External links

Italian comedy films
1951 comedy films
1951 films
Films directed by Carlo Borghesio
Depictions of Napoleon on film
Films scored by Nino Rota
Italian black-and-white films
1950s Italian films